This is a list of East Stirlingshire Football Club seasons from 1882–83 to the present day. The list details East Stirlingshire's record in major league and cup competitions, and the club's top league goal scorer of each season where available. Top scorers in bold were also the top scorers in East Stirlingshire's division that season. Records of minor competitions such as the Stirlingshire Cup are not included.

The club was founded in 1880 as Bainsford Britannia, a year later changing to its present name of East Stirlingshire. The club first competed in the Scottish Cup in 1882, two years after the club was established. The club was then admitted to the Scottish Football League in 1900.

Seasons

Key

 P = Played
 W = Wins
 D = Draws
 L = Losses
 F = Goals for
 A = Goals against
 Pts = Points
 Pos = Final position

 PR = Preliminary round
 PR1 = Preliminary round 1
 SR = Supplementary round
 Group = Group stage
 R1 = Round 1
 R2 = Round 2
 R3 = Round 3
 R4 = Round 4
 QF = Quarter-finals
 SF = Semi-finals

 Div 1 = Scottish Division One
 Div 2 = Scottish Division Two
 SFL 1 = Scottish First Division
 SFL 2 = Scottish Second Division
 SFL 3 = Scottish Football League Third Division
 SL 2 = Scottish League Two
 Lowland = Lowland Football League

Footnotes

References

Seasons
 
East Stirlingshire
Seasons